Wat Pa Lelai Worawihan is a temple in Suphan Buri Province, located on the west side of Suphanburi River on Malai Man Street, which is in the Mueang Suphanburi District of Tambon Rua Yai.

See also 

 List of Buddhist temples in Thailand

External links
 

Pa Lelai Worawihan
Buildings and structures in Suphan Buri province